Anuradhapura Railway Station is a railway station in Anuradhapura, Sri Lanka. The station is served by Sri Lanka Railways, with Northern Line services, such as the Yal Devi, calling at the station.

History
From Polgahawela, the Northern Railway line was opened up to Anuradhapura on 1 November 1904.  The construction of the line beyond Anuradhapura, to Medawachchiya, was completed on 11 March 1905.

Yal Devi was operated between Colombo and Kankasanthurei via Jaffna; (temporarily only up to Jaffna)

Services
Northern Line trains serve Anuradhapura.  Trains connect Colombo with Vavuniya, via Anuradhapura.

The railways operate a short branch line at Anuradhapura to Mihintale via Mihintale Jn.

See also
Railway stations in Sri Lanka
Sri Lanka Railways
List of railway stations by line order in Sri Lanka

References

Railway stations on the Northern Line (Sri Lanka)
Railway stations in Anuradhapura District